Coirós is a municipality of northwestern Spain in the province of A Coruña, in the autonomous community of Galicia. It has a population of 1,660 inhabitants (INE, 2007).

Location
The lands of Coirós are found between the plateau of Lugo and Las Marinas of A Coruña.

References

Municipalities in the Province of A Coruña